The 2008 WCHA Men's Ice Hockey Tournament was played between March 14 and March 22, 2008 at five conference arenas and the Xcel Energy Center in St. Paul, Minnesota. By winning the tournament, Denver was awarded the Broadmoor Trophy and received the Western Collegiate Hockey Association's automatic bid to the 2008 NCAA Men's Division I Ice Hockey Tournament.

Format
The first round of the postseason tournament featured a best-of-three games format. All ten conference teams participated in the tournament. Teams were seeded No. 1 through No. 10 according to their final conference standing, with a tiebreaker system used to seed teams with an identical number of points accumulated. The top five seeded teams each earned home ice and hosted one of the lower seeded teams.

The winners of the first round series advanced to the Xcel Energy Center for the WCHA Final Five, the collective name for the quarterfinal, semifinal, and championship rounds. The Final Five uses a single-elimination format. Teams were re-seeded No. 1 through No. 5 according to the final regular season conference standings, with the top three teams automatically advancing to the semifinals.

Conference standings

Note: GP = Games played; W = Wins; L = Losses; T = Ties; PTS = Points; GF = Goals For; GA = Goals Against

Tiebreakers
Minnesota State and St. Cloud State each finished the regular season with 28 points. Minnesota State won the tiebreaker, having the better head-to-head record of the two teams.

Bracket
Teams are reseeded after the first round

Note: * denotes overtime period(s)

First round

(1) Colorado College vs. (10) Alaska-Anchorage

(2) North Dakota vs. (9) Michigan Tech

(3) Denver vs. (8) Minnesota–Duluth

(4) Minnesota State vs. (7) Minnesota

(5) St. Cloud State vs. (6) Wisconsin

Quarterfinal

(5) St. Cloud State vs. (7) Minnesota

Semifinals

(1) Colorado College vs. (7) Minnesota

(2) North Dakota vs. (3) Denver

Third Place

(1) Colorado College vs. (2) North Dakota

Championship

(3) Denver vs. (7) Minnesota

Tournament awards

All-Tournament Team
F Mike Hoeffel (Minnesota)
F Tom May (Denver)
F T. J. Oshie (North Dakota)
D Chris Butler (Denver)
D Taylor Chorney (North Dakota)
G Peter Mannino (Denver)

MVP
Alex Kangas, (Minnesota)

See also
Western Collegiate Hockey Association men's champions

References
General

Specific

External links
Official website

WCHA Men's Ice Hockey Tournament
Wcha Men's Ice Hockey Tournament